André Paul Armand Nègre (16 May 1912 - 27 July 1996) was a French diplomat born in Castelmoron-sur-Lot in south-western France.

Career 
Nègre entered the Foreign Service and was employed after 1945 in Shanghai, Cairo and Moscow. From the year of 1952 until the year of 1955 he was a Counsellor in Damascus. In 1964 he was a Counsellor and Genera Consul  in Tangier. From the year of 1967 until the year of 1970 he was ambassador in Kabul. From 7 January  at 1971 to April 30 of 1975, he was an Ambassador Extraordinary and Plenipotentiary in Damascus.

Publications 
Nègre published works related to the history of research on  Ibāḍī studies.

 (1969) La fin de l'état rustamide. Revue d'Histoire et de Civilisation du Maghreb (Algiers), 6-7 (July 1969), 10–21.
 (1973) A propos d'une expédition fatimide à Wargilan (Ouargla) d'après Abu Zakariyya al-Wargilani. Revue d' Histoire et de Civilisation du Maghreb (Algiers), nr. 10 (Oct. 1973), 37–39.

References 

1912 births
1996 deaths
Place of death missing
20th-century French diplomats
People from Lot-et-Garonne
Ambassadors of France to Afghanistan

Ibadi Islam
Ibadi studies